Dubh Essa (also spelled Dub Essa, Dubhessa, Dubheasa, Dubh Easa, Duibhessa, Duibheasa) was a medieval Gaelic feminine given name, fairly common in 13th- and 14th-century Ireland.

While the name may be a compound of Gaelic dubh "dark" (probably referring to hair color, hence "black-haired") and eas "waterfall, cascade, rapid" (genitive easa), its meaning is sometimes interpreted as "black nurse".

Dubh Essa has also been anglicized as Duvessa (e.g., in M. J. Molloy's 1964 comedy The Wooing of Duvessa).

Bearers
 Dubh Essa ingen Briain, died 1052.
 Dubh Essa ingen Amhalgadha, died 1078.
 Dubh Essa ingen maic Aedha, died 1115.
 Dubh Essa Níc Eidhin, died 1187.
 Dubh Essa Bean Uí Dubhda, died 1190. 
 Dubhessa Ní Diarmata, died 1229.
 Dubhessa Ní hElide, died 1328.
 Dubhessa Ní Fherghail, died 1328.
 Dubhessa Bean Uí Chonchobhair, died 1328.

References

External links
 Names in Irish Annals: Dub Essa / Dubh Essa

Irish-language feminine given names